The 2018 Laver Cup was the second edition of the Laver Cup, a men's tennis tournament between teams from Europe and the rest of the world. It was held on indoor hard courts at the United Center in Chicago, United States from 21 until 23 September.

Team Europe successfully defended their title, winning the tournament 13–8. The attendance was 93,584 over the three days.

Player selection
On 19 March 2018, Roger Federer for Team Europe and Nick Kyrgios for Team World were the first players to confirm their participation. 

On 28 June 2018, Novak Djokovic and Juan Martín del Potro committed to this event, as well as Kevin Anderson, John Isner and Diego Schwartzman on 26 July 2018. 

On 13 August 2018, Alexander Zverev, Grigor Dimitrov and David Goffin announced their participation for Team Europe. As their final picks, the team captains Björn Borg and John McEnroe chose Kyle Edmund and Jack Sock, respectively. As in 2017, del Potro withdrew shortly before the tournament started and was replaced by Frances Tiafoe.

Prize money 
The total prize money for 2018 Laver Cup is set at $2,250,000 for all 12 participating players.

Each winning team member will pocket $250,000, which marks no increase in prize money compared to 2017.

Whereas, each of the losing team members will earn $125,000 each.

Participants 

Singles rankings as of 17 September 2018

Matches 
Each match win on day 1 was worth one point, on day 2 two points, and on day 3 three points. The first team to 13 points won. Since four matches were played each day, there were a total of 24 points available. However, since 12 of the total points are earned on day 3, neither team could win prior to the final day of play.

Player statistics

References

External links

2018
2018 in tennis
Tennis tournaments in the United States
2018 in American tennis
Sports competitions in Chicago
2010s in Chicago
2018 in sports in Illinois
September 2018 sports events in the United States